Maria Grazia Cucinotta (born 27 July 1968) is an Italian actress who has featured in films and television series since 1990. She has also worked as a film producer, screenwriter and model. Internationally she is best known for her roles in Il Postino and as the Bond girl, credited as "Cigar Girl", in the James Bond film The World Is Not Enough.

Early life and career

Cucinotta was born in Messina in Sicily, Italy. She is well known in Italy as a movie and television actress. She guest starred in The Sopranos episode "Isabella" as the titular character. She also appeared on The Simpsons episode "The Italian Bob" voicing Sideshow Bob's wife, Francesca.

Cucinotta won the America Award of the Italy-USA Foundation in 2010.
In 2012, Cucinotta received a star on the Italian Walk of Fame in Toronto, Ontario, Canada.

Maria Grazia Cucinotta is Roman Catholic and devoted to Saint Anthony of Padua.

Filmography

Films

Television

Television appearances

References

External links
 2006 Archived official website  
  
 
 
 

1968 births
Living people
20th-century Italian actresses
21st-century Italian actresses
Italian female models
Italian film actresses
Italian television actresses
Actors from Messina
Italian Roman Catholics